State Highway 75 (SH 75) is a State Highway in Kerala, India that starts in Thrissur and ends in Vadanappally. The highway is 16.12 km long.

The Route Map 
Thrissur - Olarikkara - Elthuruth - Kannapuram - Chettupuzha - Manakody - Kunnathangadi - Arimpoor - Kanjany -kandassankadavu- Vadanappally - Joins NH 66

See also 
Roads in Kerala
List of State Highways in Kerala

References 

State Highways in Kerala
Roads in Thrissur district